This list comprises all players who have participated in at least one league match for FC London in London, Ontario, Canada, since the team's first season in the USL Premier Development League in 2009. Players who were on the roster but never played a first team game are not listed; players who appeared for the team in other competitions (Open Canada Cup, etc.) but never actually made a USL appearance are noted at the bottom of the page where appropriate.

A
  Omar Apodaca
  Michael Arnold

B
  Thomas Beattie
  Scott Bibby
  Kyle Buxton

C
  Vince Caminiti
  Dominic Casciato
  Haris Cekic
  Scott Cliff

D
  Ali Dadikhuda
  Kevin De Serpa
  Anthony Di Biase

E
  Patrick Eavenson

F
  Sam Fairhurst
  Estevao Franco

G
  Camilo Gonzalez

H
  Chris Harrington
  Carl Haworth
  Steve Hepton
  Alan Hirmiz
  Luke Holmes
  Jarrett Humphreys

I
  Jovan Ivanovich

J
  Jeff Jelinek
  Mike Jonca

L
  Alex Lewis

M
  Ryan Maduro
  Kyle Manscuk
  Matthew Marcin
  Michael Marcoccia
  Alan McGreal
  Aaron McMurray
  Johnny Morris

P
  Michael Pereira
  Anthony Perez

R
  John Raley
  Todd Rutledge

S
  Sebastian Stihler
  Andrew Sousa

T
  Matt Tymoczko

W
  Ryan Walter
  James Welsh
  Ryan Woods

Z
  Kevin Zimmermann Cuevas

Sources

2010 Forest City London stats 
2009 Forest City London stats

References

London
 
Association football player non-biographical articles